Chondracris is a genus of grasshoppers in the subfamily Cyrtacanthacridinae. Species records are distributed throughout Asia: from India, southern China, Korea, Japan, Indo-China and Java.

Species
The Catalogue of Life lists the following (other species have now been placed in the genus Ritchiella):
Chondracris bengalensis Mungai, 1992
Chondracris rosea De Geer, 1773 - type species (as Acrydium roseum De Geer)

References

External links
 

Acrididae genera
Cyrtacanthacridinae
Orthoptera of Asia
Orthoptera of Indo-China
Taxa named by Boris Uvarov